Garry Byers (born 13 January 1939) is a former Australian rules footballer who played with Melbourne in the Victorian Football League (VFL).

Notes

External links 

1939 births
Living people
Australian rules footballers from Victoria (Australia)
Melbourne Football Club players